The Cape May City Rail Terminal is a passenger train station in Cape May, New Jersey. The station offered train service from 1863 through 1981.

The station area last had regional passenger train service by the Pennsylvania-Reading Seashore Lines in the mid-1960s. Final service into Camden, New Jersey (across the Delaware River from Philadelphia) ended in January 1966, while service to Lindenwold station ended in October 1981.

Train service resumed in 1999, but stopped in 2005 due to structural concerns, but resumed again in 2010. The terminal is located at the intersection of Lafayette and Elmira Streets.  Service was suspended after 2012 following extensive vandalism of the rail line.  In 2015 the City of Cape May announced a proposal for parking space expansion that would pave over the tracks.

Current service 
 Cape May Seashore Lines

References 

Cape May, New Jersey
Railway stations in Cape May County, New Jersey
Former Pennsylvania-Reading Seashore Lines stations
Railway stations in the United States opened in 1863
Railway stations closed in 1983
Railway stations in the United States opened in 1999
Railway stations closed in 2005
Railway stations in the United States opened in 2010
Former railway stations in New Jersey